Lucknow railway station may refer to two adjacent stations in India:

Lucknow Charbagh railway station or Lucknow NR (LKO), the larger of the two
Lucknow Junction railway station or Lucknow NER (LJN), also in Charbagh